Vandenberg Space Force Base Launch Facility 02 (LF-02) is a former US Air Force Intercontinental ballistic missile launch facility on Vandenberg SFB, California, USA.  It was a launch site for the land-based Minuteman and Peacekeeper missile series.  In the 2000s the silo was remodeled into a launch site for an Interceptor for the Ground-Based Midcourse Defense System.

Launches at LF-02

References

Vandenberg Space Force Base